The year 1984 in radio involved some significant events.

Events
 1 June – KOKU (100.3 FM) in Agana, Guam signs on the air for the first time. The first format is contemporary hit radio music.
 18 June – Controversial KOA/Denver radio talk show host Alan Berg gunned down in driveway of his home.
 4 July – KBQC-FM (93.5 FM) in Bettendorf, Iowa signs on the air for the first time. The first format is middle of the road music with a community emphasis.
 October – CKLW-AM in Windsor, Ontario, the former "Big 8" Top 40 giant plagued by falling ratings for years, fires 79 staffers and goes mostly automated in preparation for a format change to Music of Your Life on 1 January 1985. CKLW's FM sister station CFXX experiments with a Top 40/Rock hybrid format called "94 Fox FM" in some dayparts, but its application to make "The Fox" a full-time format is denied by the CRTC and the experiment lasts only a few months.
 5 November – Morning Ireland, Ireland's highest-rated radio programme, is broadcast on RTÉ Radio 1 for the first time.
 Sports writer Ralph Barbieri joins KNBR to host his own sports talk show. He lasts at the station, which is eventually sold by NBC and converted to a full-time sports radio format, up until 11 April 2012.

Deaths
 27 January: Lou Crosby, 64, announcer for Gene Autry's Melody Ranch. 
 6 May: Ned Wever, 85, radio's Dick Tracy and actor in many other old-time radio programs.
 27 April, Richard Durham, writer and producer of the anthology series Destination Freedom 
 Jim Bannon, 73, actor in radio and Hollywood western films during the 1940s and 1950s.
 Alan Berg, 50, Denver, Colorado-based liberal radio talk show host and former attorney.
 Howard Culver, 66, an American radio and television actor.
 Fred Waring, 84, popular musician, bandleader and radio-television personality, died 29 July.

See also
Radio broadcasting

References

 
Radio by year